Nanpaya Temple (lit. "palace temple") is a Hindu temple located in Myinkaba (a village south of Bagan) in Burma. The temple is adjacent to the Manuha Temple and was built by captive Thaton Kingdom King Makuta. It was built using mud mortar, stone, and brick, and was used as the residence of Manuha. The temple contains intricate carvings of Brahma, and also contains depictions of other Hindu gods. Also, because Manuha was a Mon, there are many figures and symbols of the Mon within the temple, including hinthas.

References

Hindu temples in Myanmar
Bagan